Hamgin (also Romanized as Hamgīn) is a village in Hamgin Rural District, in the Central District of Dehaqan County, Isfahan Province, Iran. At the 2006 census, its population was 1,435, in 409 families.

References 

Populated places in Dehaqan County